Leicester South by-election may refer to:
2004 Leicester South by-election
2011 Leicester South by-election